Tarakchiev Point (‘Tarakchiev Nos’ \ta-rak-'chi-ev 'nos\) is a sharp, rocky point forming the west extremity of Whittle Peninsula on Davis Coast in Graham Land on the Antarctic Peninsula.  Situated on the northeast side of the entrance to Jordanoff Bay, 4.4 km south-southwest of Cape Kater and 5 km northeast of Wennersgaard Point.

The point is named for the Bulgarian pioneer of aviation Prodan Tarakchiev (1885–1969) who, while on a joint combat air mission with Radul Milkov during the First Balkan War, used the first aerial bombs on October 16, 1912.

Location
German-British mapping in 1996.

Map
 Trinity Peninsula. Scale 1:250000 topographic map No. 5697. Institut für Angewandte Geodäsie and British Antarctic Survey, 1996.

References
 Tarakchiev Point. SCAR Composite Gazetteer of Antarctica.
 Bulgarian Antarctic Gazetteer. Antarctic Place-names Commission. (details in Bulgarian, basic data in English)

External links
 Tarakchiev Point. Copernix satellite image

Headlands of Graham Land
Bulgaria and the Antarctic
Davis Coast